Pelhams Lands or Pelhams Land today forms part of the parish of Holland Fen with Brothertoft and is situated approximately  north-west from the town of Boston, Lincolnshire.

The name 'Pelhams Lands' originates from the Pelham family who held land here from 1602. Sir William Pelham owned a woad mill in this area. The lands were laid out after the drainage of Holland Fen by Act of Parliament in 1776. 
Pelhams Lands was formerly an extra-parochial area, but was formed into a parish in 1883. Its population in 1831 was 41, and its 19th-century peak was in 1851 with 55.

Pelhams Lands Farm is a late 18th-century red-brick farmhouse and is a Grade II listed building. There are two further Grade II listed 18th-century buildings on the Farm, a stable with granary and an earth closet.

There was a tower windmill at Pelhams Lands, built in 1838 to replace an earlier post mill which had blown down. The mill lost its cap in 1926, after which it was engine driven. Now mostly demolished, only a single derelict story remains.

References

External links

Villages in Lincolnshire
Windmills in Lincolnshire
Former civil parishes in Lincolnshire
Borough of Boston